This is a list of Brazilian television related events from 2004.

Events
6 April - Cida dos Santos wins the fourth season of Big Brother Brasil.

Debuts

Television shows

1970s
Turma da Mônica (1976–present)

1990s
Malhação (1995–present)
Cocoricó (1996–present)

2000s
Sítio do Picapau Amarelo (2001–2007)
Big Brother Brasil (2002–present)
FAMA (2002-2005)

Ending this year

Births

Deaths

See also
2004 in Brazil
List of Brazilian films of 2004